The Mare' Operations Room was a joint operations room of armed Syrian rebel factions based around the town of Mare' in the Azaz District of Aleppo Governorate to fight against the Islamic State of Iraq and the Levant.

History
The operations room was in conflict with the People's Protection Units and Army of Revolutionaries, as part of the Syrian Democratic Forces, from late November 2015 until early December 2015, when a truce was reached, though the Army of Revolutionaries refused to abide by it. At the end of December 2015, the Mare' Operations Room cancelled its agreement with the SDF after the latter captured a village from the former.

In January 2016 the commander of the Mare' Operations Room, Major Yasser Abdul Rahim, who was also commander of the Sham Legion, resigned due to the lack of coordination between member groups of the operations room. Yasser continued to be the commander of Fatah Halab after he moved to Aleppo city. As a result, the operations room has become largely defunct. It was superseded by the Hawar Kilis Operations Room, established in April 2016.

Member groups

 Mountain Hawks Brigade
 Sham Legion
 Levant Front
 Thuwar al-Sham Battalion
 Fastaqim Union
 Descendants of Saladin Brigade
 Al-Mu'tasim Brigade
 Victory Brigades
 Sultan Murad Division
 Sultan Mehmed the Conqueror Brigade
 Free Syria Brigade
 Elite Islamic Battalion

See also
 List of armed groups in the Syrian Civil War

References

Anti-government factions of the Syrian civil war
Operations rooms of the Syrian civil war
Aleppo Governorate in the Syrian civil war
Anti-ISIL factions in Syria